Michichi is a hamlet in southern Alberta, Canada, within Starland County.

The name Michichi derives from the Cree word  ( 'hand'), a reference to the nearby Hand Hills.

Demographics 
The population of Michichi according to the 2013 municipal census conducted by Starland County is 34.

See also 
List of communities in Alberta
List of hamlets in Alberta

References 

Hamlets in Alberta
Starland County